Fintan Patrick Walsh (13 August 1894 – 16 May 1963) was a notable New Zealand seaman, trade unionist and farmer. He was born in Patutahi, Poverty Bay, on the East Coast of New Zealand in 1894, and died in Wellington in 1963.

He was a founding member of the Communist Party of New Zealand.

Fintan Patrick Walsh was born Patrick Tuohy at Pātūtahi, Poverty Bay, on 13 August 1894, one of eleven children of farming parents Andrew Tuohy and his wife, Hannah O'Sullivan, both born in Ireland. He was raised a Catholic but reportedly discarded his faith when he became an adult.

Walsh was president of the New Zealand Federation of Labour between 1953 and 1963.

In 1953, Walsh was awarded the Queen Elizabeth II Coronation Medal.

See also 
 Hedwig Ross, co-founder of the Communist Party of New Zealand

References

1894 births
1963 deaths
New Zealand sailors
New Zealand trade unionists
New Zealand farmers
New Zealand communists
New Zealand people of Irish descent